Okba Hezil (born May 5, 1988 in Batna) is an Algerian football player. He last played for JS Kabylie in the Algerian Ligue Professionnelle 1.

Club career
Hezil began his career in the junior ranks of his hometown club of MSP Batna.

JS Kabylie
On June 25, 2011, Hezil signed a three year contract with JS Kabylie. On July 16, 2011, he made his debut for the club as a starter in a 2011 CAF Confederation Cup group stage match against MAS Fez of Morocco.

References

External links
 

1988 births
Algerian footballers
Algerian Ligue Professionnelle 1 players
Algerian Ligue 2 players
JS Kabylie players
Living people
MSP Batna players
People from Batna, Algeria
Association football defenders
21st-century Algerian people